Governor Bush may refer to:

 George W. Bush (born 1946), 46th Governor of Texas (1995–2000) and 43rd President of the United States. (2001-2009)
 Jeb Bush (born 1953), 43rd Governor of Florida (1999–2007)

See also
Grattan Bushe, Governor of Barbados from 1941 to 1946
 Bush (disambiguation)
 President Bush (disambiguation)